Cabanillas del Campo is a municipality of Spain located in the province of Guadalajara, Castilla–La Mancha. As of 2017, it has registered population of 9,947. The municipality includes 2 supermarkets, three primary schools, one secondary (high) school and many plazas. The municipality has experienced extensive growth since the 90s, and the 2000s and 2010s saw a surge in young families who find the town's safe, child-friendly environment and amenities ideal.

References

Municipalities in the Province of Guadalajara